Gustav Christensen may refer to:

 Gustav S. Christensen (1929–2007), Danish mathematician and engineer
 Gustav Christensen (footballer) (born 2004), Danish footballer